FIDS may refer to:

 Flight information display system
 Falkland Islands Dependencies Survey

See also 
 FID (disambiguation)